Momar Nduoye (born 13 July 1995) is a Senegalese basketball player for SO Pont de Cheruy Charvieu Chavanoz of the Nationale Masculine 1. He plays for the Senegal national basketball team.

Professional career
Ndoye started playing professionally in 2016, he had previously played for the Under 21 side of the Chorale Roanne Basket and BCM Gravelines-Dunkerque. He started playing with the ANDRÉZIEUX ALS BASKET in the 2016–17 season, where he averaged 1.2 points, 1.6 rebound and 0.3 assists per game. In the 2017–18 season, he averaged 5.1 points, 3.6 rebound and 1.2 assists per game. On the July 9, 2018, he moved to Feurs Enfants du Forez Basket, he averaged 8.6 points, 4.6 rebound and 0.7 assist per game. In the 2019–20 season, he moved to the JA Vichy-Clermont Métropole Basket. Ndoye averaged 2.0 points and 1.8 rebounds per game in LNB Pro B. On September 3, 2020, he signed with SO Pont de Cheruy Charvieu Chavanoz of the Nationale Masculine 1.

National team career
Nomar Nduoye represented the Senegal national basketball team at the 2019 FIBA Basketball World Cup in China, where he averaged 0.2 points, 1.2 rebound and 0.2 assists per game.

References

External links
 Eurobasket.com profile

1995 births
Living people
2019 FIBA Basketball World Cup players
Forwards (basketball)
JA Vichy-Clermont Métropole players
People from Rufisque
Senegalese expatriate basketball people in France
Senegalese men's basketball players